Vivian Reed (April 17, 1894 – July 19, 1989) was an American silent film actress. She appeared in 36 films between 1914 and 1938.

Biography

Born in Pittsburgh, Pennsylvania, Reed died in Woodland Hills, Los Angeles, California. She was married to film director Alfred E. Green and they had three children—Douglas Green, Hilton A. Green, and Marshall Green—all of whom worked as assistant directors.

She had the role of Princess Gloria in His Majesty, the Scarecrow of Oz. This was the last Oz film produced by L. Frank Baum. One of her films, The Lad and the Lion (1917), was the first adaptation of an Edgar Rice Burroughs novel, predating the Tarzan films.  As with many early silent films, no copies of this lost film are known to exist. She also portrayed Princess Ozma in the introductions to films made by The Oz Film Manufacturing Company. She had a non-speaking, minor role in the 1939 film version of The Wizard of Oz.

Selected filmography

References

External links

 

1894 births
1989 deaths
Actresses from Pittsburgh
American film actresses
American silent film actresses
20th-century American actresses
Burials at Forest Lawn Memorial Park (Glendale)